Frances McNeil, also writing as Frances Brody, is an English novelist and playwright, and has written extensively for radio.

Early life
McNeil was born in Leeds, West Yorkshire, where she now lives. She studied at Ruskin College, Oxford and has a degree in English literature and History from University of York.

Writing
As Frances Brody she has written a series of 1920s crime novels featuring Kate Shackleton.  The sixth in the series, An Avid Reader, is set in the Leeds Library, the oldest surviving subscription library of its type in the UK. After nine books in the series Brody wrote a short story prequel, Kate Shackleton's First Case, in which the story begins in a Harrogate teashop. The twelfth book in the series (excluding "first case") was Death and the Brewery Queen, published in 2020, and the thirteenth,  A Mansion for Murder, in 2022. Each book in the series is set in a specific location in Yorkshire. A Woman Unknown was shortlisted for the 2016 Simon & Schuster Mary Higgins Clark Award, the criteria for which include: "the protagonist is a nice young woman whose life is suddenly invaded".

In 2021 Brody published A Murder Inside, the first in the Brackerly Prison Mysteries series set in a 1960s women's prison in Yorkshire.

She wrote three novels under her own name, which were republished in 2016 under the name Frances Brody. Sisters on Bread Street is partly based on the story of her mother, who lived on Bread Street in Leeds as a child; it was published in a limited edition just after her mother's hundredth birthday, published in an expanded edition as Somewhere Behind the Morning, and republished in 2016 under its original title.  Sixpence in her Shoe relates to the Leeds Children's Holiday Camp Association based at Silverdale, Lancashire, about which she has also written a factual history, Now I am a Swimmer (the title being a quote from a child's letter home). Sisters of Fortune is the tale of two girls of different financial backgrounds growing up in Leeds, and was republished as Halfpenny Dreams.

Her plays include Tressell, about Robert Tressell, author of The Ragged-Trousered Philanthropists.

An archive of her literary papers is held by the University of Leeds.

Selected publications

Writing as Frances McNeil
Sisters on Bread Street (Limited edition, 2003, Pavan Press, ; published as Somewhere Behind the Morning 2006, Orion Books, ; republished January 2016 as Sisters on Bread Street, a Frances Brody book, Piatkus)
Sixpence in her Shoe (2007, Orion Books, ; republished April 2016 as a Frances Brody book, Piatkus)
Sisters of Fortune (2007, Severn House, ; republished July 2016 as Halfpenny Dreams, a Frances Brody book, Piatkus)
Now I am a Swimmer (2004, Pavan Press) (Non-fiction account of the Leeds Children's Holiday Camp Association)

Writing as Frances Brody – the Kate Shackleton books 
Dying in the Wool (2009, Piatkus) Set in the fictional village of Bridgestead, based on Cottingley
A Medal for Murder (2010, Piatkus) Set in Harrogate
Murder in the Afternoon (2011, Piatkus) Set in the fictional quarry village of Great Applewick in the Yorkshire Dales
A Woman Unknown (2012, Piatkus) Set in Leeds
Murder on a Summer's Day (2013, Piatkus) Set at Bolton Abbey
Death of an Avid Reader (2014, Piatkus) Set at the Leeds Library
A Death in the Dales (2015, Piatkus) Set in the Yorkshire Dales around Langcliffe
Death at the Seaside (2016, Piatkus) Set in Whitby
Death in the Stars (2017, Piatkus) Set at Giggleswick School at the time of the Solar eclipse of June 29, 1927
Kate Shackleton's First Case (2018, ebook, Little, Brown) Set in Harrogate
A Snapshot of Murder (2018, Piatkus)  Includes the short story Kate Shackleton's First Case; set at Ponden Hall
The Body on the Train (2019, Piatkus) Set in the Rhubarb Triangle featuring the early-morning train to King's Cross 
Death and the Brewery Queen (2020, Piatkus), published in United States as Murder is in the Air (2020, Crooked Lane) Set in Masham, home to Theakston Brewery and Black Sheep Brewery 
A Mansion for Murder (2022, Piatkus) Set at Milner Field (now demolished) near Saltaire

Writing as Frances Brody – the Brackerley Prison Mysteries 
A Murder Inside (29 October 2021, Piatkus)

References

External links
 As Frances McNeil
 As Frances Brody 

Year of birth missing (living people)
Living people
English women novelists
English crime fiction writers
English dramatists and playwrights
English women dramatists and playwrights
Women crime fiction writers
English novelists
Alumni of Ruskin College
Alumni of the University of York
Writers from Leeds